War Memorial Park is a park in Singapore, located at the junctions of Beach Road, Stamford Road, Nicoll Highway and Bras Basah Road in the Downtown Core of Singapore's Central Region next to Esplanade MRT station. The Civilian War Memorial is located at the center of the park as a memorial to civilians who died in Singapore during World War II. It is managed by the National Parks Board.

History 

During the Sook Ching massacre that occurred in Singapore during World War II, mass war graves were dug to contain the bodies of civilians who were killed by the Japanese. When the bodies were unearthed in 1962 in various places, the Singapore Chinese Chamber of Commerce and Industry (SCCCI) decided to gather the remains and create a memorial for them.

On 15 June 1963, in a monumental ceremony attended by VIPs, inter-religious organisations, community leaders and many others, the then Prime Minister officiated at the launch of the Civilian War Memorial project ceremony. The project was completed and the monument was unveiled on 15 February 1967 in conjunction with the 25th anniversary of the Fall of Singapore.

The monument was named the Civilian War Memorial.

Park 
The park with the Civilian War Memorial is a popular sightseeing venue among tourists and locals.

See also

 List of Parks in Singapore
 National Parks Board

References

External links
National Parks Board
National Parks Board - War Memorial Park

Parks in Singapore
1967 establishments in Singapore